Nicolas Zisti (born 2 August 1972) is an Italian Australian former professional rugby league and rugby union footballer who played in the 1990s and 2000s.

Background
Nicolas Zisti was born in Sydney, New South Wales, Australia.

Playing career

Rugby League
Nick Zisti began his professional career playing for the South Sydney Rabbitohs where he made 6 appearances off the bench between 1991 and 1993, scoring no points.

From there he went on to play for the St. George Dragons where he scored 19 tries in 18 games for the Dragons between 1994–96. He scored the Dragons only try in their 1996 20–8 Grand Final defeat by the Manly-Warringah Sea Eagles.

In 1997, he signed for the short-lived Hunter Mariners (with the club only lasting one season in the premiership). He played 16 games, scoring 9 tries and kicking 20 goals. He is the Mariners leading scorer in what was their only season. He set numerous records for the club including most tries, goals, points in a match and most points in a season. Zisti also played in the Hunter Mariners final game, a 36-12 loss against Brisbane in the 1997 World Club Challenge final.

Following the club's demise, he moved to the Cronulla-Sutherland Sharks where he played nine games scoring four tries in the season of 1998. After spending all of his career in Australia he decided to move to England to play in the Super League club the Bradford Bulls.

Rugby Union
In October 1999 he made his international début for the Italy national rugby union team in a World Cup match against England national rugby union team.

In 1999 he signed a 3-years agreement with Rugby Roma Olimpic, a rugby union team from Rome, Italy. He won the Italian championship in 2000. He won his last international cap for Italy during the 2000 Six Nations vs. France.

In December 2001, because of Rugby Roma's financial problems, he asked to be let free and flew back to Australia.

References

External links

1972 births
Living people
Australian people of Italian descent
Australian expatriate sportspeople in England
Rugby union players from Sydney
Bradford Bulls players
Cronulla-Sutherland Sharks players
Hunter Mariners players
Italian expatriate sportspeople in England
Italy international rugby union players
Rugby league players from Sydney
Rugby league centres
Rugby league wingers
Rugby union centres
Rugby union wings
Rugby Roma Olimpic players
South Sydney Rabbitohs players
St. George Dragons players